Patrick Olaiya Olukayode Owomoyela (born 5 November 1979) is a German former professional footballer of Nigerian descent who played mainly as a right-back. He previously played for Lüneburger SK, VfL Osnabrück, SC Paderborn 07, Arminia Bielefeld, SV Werder Bremen, Borussia Dortmund and Hamburger SV II. He was capped by Germany at international level and was a member of the squad at the 2005 FIFA Confederations Cup.

Club career 
Owomoyela began his career in lower league German football. In 2003, he made the step up to Arminia Bielefeld, then in the 2. Bundesliga.

Great performances for Bielefeld in the 2004–05 season earned Owomoyela interest from German top clubs, and ahead of the 2005–06 season, he joined SV Werder Bremen. In his first season, Owomoyela was the undisputed starter at right back and helped Bremen reach second in the Bundesliga. With the arrival of Clemens Fritz the following season, however, he lost his starting position due to injuries and bad displays. Owomoyela was finally transferred to Borussia Dortmund at the beginning of the 2008–09 season, where he looked to reestablish himself in German top-flight football.

International career 
Owomoyela debuted for Jürgen Klinsmann's Germany national side in an Asian tour, playing 90 minutes in a 3–0 win over Japan, on 16 December 2004, in Yokohama. He later was selected in the Bundestrainers team for the Confederations Cup in 2005, but was unused there and was finally overlooked for Germany's World Cup final squad. In total he collected eleven caps.

 Post-retirement 
Following his retirement, Owomoyela became an English language commentator for Bundesliga and DFB-Pokal international broadcasts.

 Personal life 
In addition to his football skills, Owomoyela is also a basketball player, having played in the German regional league before switching to football full-time. He was born to a German mother and a Nigerian father. His name "Olukayode" stems from the Yoruba words "Olu", a diminutive form of "Oluwa" or Olorun meaning "God" and "Kayode" meaning "to bring joy", which translates to "God brings me joy and happiness".

Career statistics

Club

International

HonoursWerder BremenDFL-Ligapokal: 2006Borussia Dortmund'
 Bundesliga: 2010–11, 2011–12
 DFB-Pokal: 2011–12

References

External links 
 

1979 births
Living people
Footballers from Hamburg
German footballers
Association football fullbacks
Germany international footballers
2005 FIFA Confederations Cup players
Bundesliga players
2. Bundesliga players
3. Liga players
Lüneburger SK players
VfL Osnabrück players
SC Paderborn 07 players
Arminia Bielefeld players
SV Werder Bremen players
Borussia Dortmund players
Borussia Dortmund II players
German sportspeople of Nigerian descent
German people of Yoruba descent
Yoruba sportspeople
Borussia Dortmund non-playing staff